Cattenières is a railway station located in the commune of Cattenières in the Nord department, France.  The station is served by TER Hauts-de-France trains (Douai - Saint-Quentin). Its elevation is 103 m.

See also

List of SNCF stations in Hauts-de-France

References

Railway stations in Nord (French department)
Railway stations in France opened in 1858